Easton Leisure Centre is a leisure centre in Easton, Bristol, UK. It contains a gym and swimming pool. It is one of the three most used leisure facilities in the Bristol City Council area, the other two being Hengrove Park Leisure Centre and Horfield Leisure Centre. It is operated by Everyone Active on behalf of the Council.

In May 2022, a solar-based heating system was installed to suplement the existing gas heating. During daytimes in the summer, the pool was able to rely entirely on solar energy for its heating.

Facilities 
There is also a water slide.

References 

Sports venues in Bristol
Swimming venues in England